Ivan Stepanovych Plyushch (September 11, 1941 – June 25, 2014) was a Ukrainian politician. He thrice served as the Chairman of the Verkhovna Rada (parliament of Ukraine), from July 9 to July 23, 1990 (acting), from December 5, 1991, to May 11, 1994, and from February 1, 2000, to May 14, 2002.

Biography
Ivan Plyushch was born on September 11, 1941, in Borzna in Chernihiv Oblast. After graduation in 1959 from Borzna Agricultural College he started his professional career as a mid-level worker, an agronomist, and the head of a division in a few state farms and collective farms in Baryshivka Raion. Between 1967 and 1974 Plyushch was the head of Kirov collective farm and the head of Lenin state farm in Baryshivka Raion. Between 1975 and 1977 he was in Kyiv working as a vice-deputy of a Kyiv Oblast regional committee of the Communist Party of Ukraine. Between 1977 and 1979 Plyushch studied in Moscow at the Central Committee of the Communist Party Academy of Social Science. After his studies he continued working in Kyiv in the divisions of the Communist Party of Kyiv Oblast. In 1984 he became the vice-head, and later the head of Kyiv Oblast Administration. In 1990 he was elected the head of Kyiv Oblast Rada.

In 1990 Plyushch was elected to the Supreme Council of Ukraine where he worked for four consecutive сonvocations. On three occasions he served as Chairman of the Supreme Council; July 9 to July 23, 1990 (acting),  5 December 1991 to 11 May 1994, and 1 February 2000, to 14 May 2002.

In 1994 Ivan Stepanovych participated in the presidential election. He won 1.29% votes, and took the 6th place out of 7 candidates. Leonid Kuchma was elected as the President in the election.

In the 2006 parliamentary elections, Plyushch was leading the electoral block named after him and Kostenko. The block won 1,87% of popular vote, short of the required 3% threshold, and obtained no seats in the parliament.

In May 2007 Plyushch was appointed secretary of the Ukrainian National Security and Defence Council by President Viktor Yushchenko. Plyushch interpreted the council's responsibilities to include economic, environmental and energy security as well as military matters. This made it a key instrument in the President's efforts to assert his authority over the government headed by Prime Minister Viktor Yanukovych.

In the 2007 parliamentary elections, Plyushch was elected as a candidate of the President's Our Ukraine bloc. He opposed a coalition with the Yulia Tymoshenko Bloc and he was dismissed as Security and Defence Council Secretary by the President in November 2007, shortly before Yanukovych was replaced as Prime Minister by Yulia Tymoshenko.

Plyushch became a creating member of Reforms for the Future in February 2011.

In the 2012 parliamentary elections Plyushch was not a candidate.

Plyushch died on June 25, 2014, at the age of 72 after a long battle with cancer.

Awards 
 Hero of Ukraine with the Order of the State (2001)
 The Order of Prince Yaroslav the Wise 5th (1996), 4th (2007) and 3rd (2011) Cl.
 Cross of Ivan Mazepa (2010)

References

External links

 OpenUA: Ivan Plyushch

1941 births
2014 deaths
People from Borzna
Communist Party of Ukraine (Soviet Union) politicians
20th-century Ukrainian politicians
People's Democratic Party (Ukraine) politicians
Our Ukraine (political party) politicians
Chairmen of the Verkhovna Rada
Recipients of the title of Hero of Ukraine
Recipients of the Order of Prince Yaroslav the Wise, 3rd class
Recipients of the Order of Prince Yaroslav the Wise, 4th class
Recipients of the Order of Prince Yaroslav the Wise, 5th class
Recipients of the Cross of Ivan Mazepa
Candidates in the 1994 Ukrainian presidential election
Soviet leaders of Ukraine
Chairmen of the Verkhovna Rada of the Ukrainian Soviet Socialist Republic
Secretaries of National Security and Defense Council of Ukraine
21st-century Ukrainian politicians